Boreotrophon apolyonis is a species of sea snail, a marine gastropod mollusk in the family Muricidae, the murex snails or rock snails.

Description
White shell cover in enamel with more than four whorls, an eroded apex and a low, sharp axial sculpture. There is no spiral sculpture and the  aperture is wide. The last whorl has a blunted angle. The height of the shell is 21 millimeters with a diameter of 10 millimeters.

References

Gastropods described in 1919
Boreotrophon